The Lezas Formation is a Mesozoic geologic formation in Spain. Pterosaur fossils have been recovered from the formation.

See also

 List of pterosaur-bearing stratigraphic units

Footnotes

References

Mesozoic Erathem of Europe